This is a list of Association football games played by the Denmark national football team between 2000 and 2009. During the 2000s, the Danish national team played 109 games, winning 54, drawing 30, and losing 25. In these games, they scored 171 goals, while conceding 98 to their opponents. The first game of the 2000s was the March 29, 2000 game against Portugal, the 639th overall Danish national team game. The last game of the 2000s was the November 18, 2009 game against United States, the 747th game of the Danish national team.

Key
EC – European Championship match
ECQ – European Championship Qualifying match
F – Friendly match
WC – World Cup match
WCQ – World Cup Qualifying match

Games
Note that scores are written Denmark first

(a): Match abandoned (after 88 minutes by the result 3-3). UEFA has settled the result 0-3 but maintains the original goals and the yellow and red cards.

See also
List of Denmark national football team results
Denmark national football team statistics

Sources
Landsholdsdatabasen  at Danish Football Association
A-LANDSKAMPE - 2000 - 2009 at Haslund.info

2000s
1999–2000 in Danish football
2000–01 in Danish football
2001–02 in Danish football
2002–03 in Danish football
2003–04 in Danish football
2004–05 in Danish football
2005–06 in Danish football
2006–07 in Danish football
2007–08 in Danish football
2008–09 in Danish football
2009–10 in Danish football